"Song for a Sleepwalker" was the second single to be released from the album The Official Fiction by the Australian rock group Something for Kate. It was ranked #63 on Triple J Hottest 100, 2003.

Track listings
Australian CD
 "Song for a Sleepwalker" (Album Version)
 "Moving Right Along" (Alternate Version)
 "Anchormann II"
 "Faster"

Charts

External links

2003 singles
Something for Kate songs
2003 songs